The First Washington Conference, also known as the Arcadia Conference (ARCADIA was the code name used for the conference), was held in Washington, D.C., from December 22, 1941, to January 14, 1942. President Roosevelt of the United States and Prime Minister Churchill of the United Kingdom attended the conference, where they discussed a future United Nations.

Background 
On 7/8 December 1941, Japan invaded Thailand and attacked the British colonies of Malaya, Singapore, and Hong Kong as well as the United States military and naval bases in Hawaii, Wake Island, Guam, and the Philippines. 

On 8 December, the United Kingdom, the United States, Canada, and the Netherlands declared war on Japan, followed by China and Australia the next day. Four days after Pearl Harbor, Germany and Italy declared war on the United States, drawing the country into a two-theater war.

History 
The conference brought together the top British and American military leaders, as well as Winston Churchill and Franklin Roosevelt and their aides, in Washington from December 22, 1941, to January 14, 1942, and led to a series of major decisions that shaped the war effort in 1942–1943.

Arcadia was the first  meeting on military strategy between Britain and the United States; it came two weeks after the American entry into World War II.  The Arcadia Conference was a secret agreement unlike the much wider postwar plans given to the public as the Atlantic Charter, agreed between Churchill and Roosevelt in August 1941.

The main policy achievements of Arcadia  included the decision for "Germany First" (or "Europe first"—that is, the defeat of Germany was the highest priority); the establishment of the Combined Chiefs of Staff, based in Washington, for approving the military decisions of both the US and Britain; the principle of unity of command of each theater under a supreme commander; drawing up measures to keep China in the war; limiting the reinforcements to be sent to the Pacific; and setting up a system for coordinating shipping. All the decisions were secret, except the conference drafted the Declaration by United Nations, which committed the Allies to make no separate peace with the enemy, and to employ full resources until victory.

In immediate tactical terms, the decisions at Arcadia included an invasion of North Africa in 1942, sending American bombers to bases in England, and for the British to strengthen their forces in the Pacific.  Arcadia created a unified American-British-Dutch-Australian Command (ABDA) in the Far East; the ABDA fared poorly.  
It was also agreed at the conference to combine military resources under one command in the European Theater of Operations (ETO).

Participants
Heads of state/government
President of the United States, Franklin D. Roosevelt
Prime Minister of the United Kingdom, Winston Churchill
British officers
Admiral of the Fleet, Sir Dudley Pound, First Sea Lord and Chief of the Naval Staff
Field Marshal Sir John Dill - Chief of the Imperial General Staff (replaced as CIGS by Alan Brooke during conference)
Air Chief Marshal Sir Charles Portal, Chief of Air Staff
Admiral Sir Charles Little, Head of British Joint Staff Mission to USA
Lt. General Sir Colville Wemyss, Head of the British Army Mission to USA. Joint Staff Mission
Air Marshal Arthur Harris,  Head of RAF delegation to the USA. Joint Staff Mission
U. S. Naval officers
Admiral H. R. Stark, Chief of Naval Operations
Admiral E. J. King, Commander-in-Chief, U. S. Fleet
Rear Admiral F. J. Horne, Assistant Chief of Naval Operations
Rear Admiral J. H. Towers, Chief, Bureau of Aeronautics
Rear Admiral R. K. Turner, Director, War Plans Division
Major General Thomas Holcomb, Commandant, U. S. Marine Corps
U. S. Army officers
General George C. Marshall, Commanding General of the Field Forces and Chief of Staff, U. S. Army
Lieut. General H. H. Arnold, Chief of the Army Air Forces and Deputy Chief of Staff, U. S. Army
Brigadier General L. T. Gerow, Chief of War Plans Division
Joint secretaries
Captain J. L. McCrea, Aide to Chief of Naval Operations
Lieut. Colonel P. M. Robinett, G-2, GHQ, U. S. Army
Major William T. Sexton, Assistant Secretary, W.D.G.S.

See also
 Diplomatic history of World War II
Washington Conference
List of World War II conferences
U.S.-British Staff Conference (ABC-1) - the staff meeting that laid the groundwork for this political meeting.
Second Washington Conference
Third Washington Conference

Notes

References

Primary sources
  Bland, Larry I. ed. The Papers of George Catlett Marshall: "The Right Man for the Job," December 7, 1941-May 31, 1943 (Volume 3) (1991) pp 29–68.

Further reading
 Bercuson, David, and Holger Herwig. One Christmas in Washington: Roosevelt and Churchill Forge the Grand Alliance (2005), 320pp; full-scale scholarly history of Arcadia.
 Danchev, Alex. Being Friends: The Combined Chiefs of Staff and the Making of Allied Strategy in the Second World War (1992)
 Lacey, James. The Washington War: FDR's Inner Circle and the Politics of Power That Won World War II (2019) pp. 196–212.
 McNeill, William Hardy. America, Britain and Russia: Their Cooperation and Conflict 1941-1946 (1953) pp 90–118
 Matloff, Maurice, and Edwin M. Snell. Strategic Planning for Coalition Warfare 1941-1942. Washington (1953) Chapter V and Chapter VI
 Rice, Anthony J. "Command and control: the essence of coalition warfare." Parameters (1997) v 27 pp: 152–167.
 Rigby, David. Allied Master Strategists: The Combined Chiefs of Staff in World War II (2012)  excerpt and text search
 Roberts, Andrew. Masters and Commanders: How Four Titans Won the War in the West, 1941-1945 (2009), pp 66–101; covers the wartime interactions of Roosevelt, Churchill, Marshall, and Brooke.
 Shortal, John F. Code Name Arcadia: The First Wartime Conference of Churchill and Roosevelt (Texas A&M University Press, 2021).

External links
 Conferences of the Allied Grand Strategy by Steven Schoenherr 
 World War II Timeline by Steven Schoenherr
 This Day in History January 1 - The History Channel
 

World War II conferences
Diplomatic conferences in the United States
1941 conferences
1941 in the United States
1941 in international relations
1942 in international relations
1942 conferences
1941 in Washington, D.C.
1942 in Washington, D.C.
United Kingdom–United States relations
British Empire in World War II
December 1941 events
January 1942 events